Nashville Girl is a 1976 film from New World Pictures about an aspiring country and western singer.

It was also known as New Girl in Town and Country Music Daughter to capitalize on the success of the similar film Coal Miner's Daughter.

Roger Corman says the film was very popular in the South and also in Europe, which surprised him.

Plot
Jamie, a 16 year old country music singer, runs away from home to try and become a star, only to find herself being sexually manipulated and exploited by older men in the country music business.

Cast
Monica Gayle - Jamie 
Glenn Corbett - Jeb 
Roger Davis - Kelly 
Johnny Rodriguez - Himself 
Jesse White - C.Y. Ordell 
Marcie Barkin - Alice 
Shirley Jo Finney - Frisky 
Judith Roberts - Fran 
Leo Gordon - Burt

References

External links

Nashville Girl at Trailers From Hell

1970s English-language films
1976 drama films
1976 films
American drama films
Country music
Films directed by Gus Trikonis
New World Pictures films
1970s American films